Liiva may refer to several places in Estonia:

Liiva, Tallinn, subdistrict of Tallinn
Liiva, Kose Parish, village in Kose Parish, Harju County
Liiva, Pärnu County, village in Pärnu City, Pärnu County
Liiva, Muhu Parish, village in Muhu Parish, Saare County
Liiva, Saaremaa Parish, village in Saaremaa Parish, Saare County
Liiva, Võru County, village in Sõmerpalu Parish, Võru Count

Places formerly known as Liiva
Aidu-Liiva, village in Lüganuse Parish, Ida-Viru County
Erra-Liiva, village in Lüganuse Parish, Ida-Viru County
Kaali-Liiva (formerly Liiva), village in Saaremaa Parish, Saare County
Kalevi-Liiva, place in Jõelähtme Parish, Harju County
Kihelkonna-Liiva (formerly Liiva), village in Saaremaa Parish, Saare County
Laugu-Liiva (formerly Liiva), village in Saaremaa Parish, Saare County
Liivaranna (formerly Liiva), village in Saaremaa Parish, Saare County

People
It is also an Estonian surname:
Johan Liiva (born 1970) — Swedish heavy metal musician of Estonian descent.

See also
Liiv, a surname